Kilzer is a surname. Notable people with the surname include:

 John Kilzer (1957–2019), American rock singer and songwriter
 Lou Kilzer (born 1951), American investigative journalist and author 
 Ralph Kilzer (born 1935), American politician

See also
 Kizer